MS Seatruck Pennant is a roll-on/roll-off freight ferry built in 2009 owned by the Clipper Group that has been chartered to a number of operators. As at January 2020, it was operating for P&O Ferries between Liverpool and Dublin.

History
Clipper Pennant was built by Astilleros de Huelva, Spain, as yard number 823. Laid down on 15 June 2006 and launched on 15 October 2008, Clipper Pennant was completed on 24 August 2009. It arrived in Liverpool on its delivery voyage on 22 September 2009. Homeported in Limassol, Cyprus, she was employed on Seatruck Ferries' Liverpool to Dublin route. Clipper Pennant made her maiden revenue-earning voyage for Seatruck on 13 October 2009.

In May 2012 Clipper Pennant was placed onto Seatruck's Heysham - Warrenpoint route to cover for Seatruck Pace which has gone on charter to DFDS Seaways. It has since operated for Stena Line and Smyril Line, and as at January 2020 was operating Liverpool to Dublin services for P&O Ferries.

In December 2022, Clipper Pennant had her name changed to Seatruck Pennant, inline with the rest of the Seatruck Ferries vessels.

Description
Seatruck Pennant is one of four "P Series" roll-on/roll-off freight ferries. Det Norske Veritas class the vessel as a 1A1 General Cargo Carrier - with whom Clipper Pennant is allocated the number 27192.

The vessel is powered by two Wärtsilä 8L45D diesel engines which drives two variable pitch propellers. The vessel is also equipped with two Wärtsilä CT200 bow thrusters.

Sister Vessels
Clipper Pace
Clipper Panorama
Clipper Point

References

External links

Current location of Clipper Pennant

2008 ships
Ships of Seatruck Ferries
Merchant ships of Cyprus
Ferries of the United Kingdom
Ships built in Spain